This list of United States Tri-Service aircraft designations includes prototype, pre-production and operational type designations under the United States Tri-Service aircraft designation system, which replaced the 1924 Air Force, 1922 Navy, and 1956 Army designation systems in 1962.

For pre-1962 Air Force aircraft designations, see List of United States Air Force aircraft designations (1919–1962). For pre-1962 Navy aircraft designations, see List of United States Navy aircraft designations (pre-1962). For aircraft that did not receive formal designations—including those procured before 1919 when no designation system was in force, and later aircraft that did not receive designations for other reasons—see List of undesignated military aircraft of the United States.

A: Attack aircraft 
 A-1 Skyraider – Douglas (redesignated from Navy AD)
 A-1 Sky Warden – Air Tractor/L3Harris (conflicting designation, assigned after original A-1 was retired)
 A-2 Savage – North American (redesignated from Navy AJ)
 A-3 Skywarrior – Douglas (redesignated from Navy A3D)
 A-4 Skyhawk – Douglas (redesignated from Navy A4D)
 A-5 Vigilante – North American (redesignated from Navy A3J)
 A-6 Intruder – Grumman (redesignated from Navy A2F)
 A-7 Corsair II – Ling-Temco-Vought
 A-8 – skipped
 A-9 – Northrop
 A-10 Thunderbolt II – Fairchild Republic
 A-11 – skipped
 A-12 Avenger II – McDonnell Douglas/General Dynamics (not built)

Non-sequential designations 
 F/A-18 Hornet – McDonnell Douglas
 F/A-18E/F Super Hornet – Boeing
 EA-18G Growler – Boeing
 A-26 Invader – Douglas (originally designated A-26, then B-26 after the B-26 Marauder was retired, reverted to original A-26 in Vietnam era)
 A-29 Super Tucano – Embraer
 A-37 Dragonfly – Cessna (redesignated from AT-37)

B: Bomber 
 B-1 Lancer – Rockwell
 B-2 Spirit – Northrop Grumman

Non-sequential designation 
 B-21 Raider – Northrop Grumman (in development)
 FB-22 – Lockheed Martin (not built)
 FB-111 Aardvark – General Dynamics (redesignated F-111G after role change)

C: Cargo/Transport 
 C-1 Trader – Grumman (redesignated from Navy TF)
 C-2 Greyhound – Grumman
 C-3 – Martin (redesignated from Navy RM)
 C-4 Academe – Grumman
 C-5 Galaxy – Lockheed
 C-6 – Beechcraft
 C-7 Caribou – de Havilland Canada
 C-7 – de Havilland Canada (conflicting designation)
 C-8 Buffalo – de Havilland Canada
 C-9 Nightingale/Skytrain II – McDonnell Douglas
 C-10 Jetstream – Handley Page (not built)
 C-10 Extender – McDonnell Douglas (conflicting designation, assigned after original C-10 was canceled)
 C-11 – Gulfstream
 C-12 Huron – Beechcraft
 RC-12 Guardrail – Beechcraft
 C-13 – skipped
 C-14 – Boeing
 C-15 – McDonnell Douglas
 C-16 – skipped
 C-17 Globemaster III – Boeing
 C-18 – Boeing
 C-19 – Boeing
 C-20 – Gulfstream
 C-20F/G/H/J – Gulfstream
 C-21 – Learjet
 C-22 – Boeing
 C-23 Sherpa – Short
 C-24 – Douglas
 C-25 – Boeing
 C-26 – Fairchild
 C-27 Spartan – Aeritalia
 C-27J Spartan – Alenia
 C-28 Titan – Cessna
 C-29  – British Aerospace 
 C-30 – skipped
 C-31 Troopship – Fokker
 C-32 – Boeing
 C-33 – Boeing
 C-34 – skipped
 C-35 – Cessna
 C-36 – reserved for a four-engined aircraft, speculated to have been the Boeing YAL-1
 C-37 – Gulfstream
 C-38 – Gulfstream
 C-39 – skipped
 C-40 Clipper – Boeing
 C-41 – CASA
 C-42 – skipped
 C-43 – skipped
 C-44 – skipped
 C-45 – EADS/Northrop Grumman (not built)
 C-46 Pegasus – Boeing

Revived 1924-1962 sequence (2005-present) 
Only aircraft designated after the adoption of the Tri-Service system are listed below.  For aircraft in the sequence designated before 1962, see List of United States Air Force aircraft designations (1919–1962).
 C-143 – Bombardier
 C-144 Ocean Sentry – EADS
 C-145 Skytruck – PZL
 C-146 Wolfhound – Dornier
 C-147 – de Havilland Canada

Non-sequential designations 
 C-767 – Boeing
 C-880 – Convair

D: Unmanned aerial vehicle (UAV) control segment 
The "D" sequence is assigned to ground control stations for UAVs.

 D-1 – General Atomics, ground equipment for the MQ-1 Predator
 D-2 – Northrop Grumman, ground equipment for the RQ-4 Global Hawk
 D-3 – Northrop Grumman, ground equipment for the MQ-4C Triton
 D-4 – Northrop Grumman, ground equipment for the MQ-8 Fire Scout
 D-5 – US Navy, ground equipment for the MQ-25 Stingray

E: Special electronic installation 
 E-1 Tracer – Grumman (redesignated from Navy WF)
 E-2 Hawkeye – Grumman (redesignated from Navy W2F)
 E-3 Sentry – Boeing
 E-4 – Boeing
 E-5 Eagle – Windecker
 E-6 Mercury – Boeing
 E-7 – designation proposed for EC-18B but not approved
 E-8 Joint STARS – Northrop Grumman
 E-9 Widget – de Havilland Canada
 E-10 MC2A – Boeing/Northrop Grumman
 E-11 – Bombardier/Northrop Grumman

F: Fighter 
 F-1 Fury – North American (redesignated from Navy FJ)
 F-1E/F Fury – North American (redesignated from Navy FJ-4)
 F-2 Banshee – McDonnell (redesignated from Navy F2H)
 F-3 Demon – McDonnell (redesignated from Navy F3H)
 F-4 Phantom II – McDonnell Douglas (redesignated from Navy F4H and Air Force F-110)
 F-5 Freedom Fighter/Tiger II – Northrop
 F-5G – Northrop (redesignated to F-20)
 F-6 Skyray – Douglas (redesignated from Navy F4D)
 F-7 Sea Dart – Convair (redesignated from Navy F2Y)
 F-8 Crusader – Vought (redesignated from Navy F8U)
 F-9 Panther – Grumman (redesignated from Navy F9F)
 F-9F/H/J Cougar – Grumman (redesignated from Navy F9F-6/7/8)
 F-10 Skyknight – Douglas (redesignated from Navy F3D)
 F-11 Tiger – Grumman (redesignated from Navy F11F)
 F-12 – Lockheed
 F-12C – Lockheed (unofficial cover designation for the SR-71)
 F-13 – skipped
 F-14 Tomcat – Grumman
 F-15 Eagle – McDonnell Douglas
 F-15E Strike Eagle – McDonnell Douglas/Boeing
 F-16 Fighting Falcon – General Dynamics/Lockheed Martin
 NF-16D VISTA – General Dynamics/Lockheed Martin (redesignated X-62 in 2021)
 F-16XL – General Dynamics
 F-17 Cobra – Northrop
 F/A-18 Hornet – McDonnell Douglas
 F/A-18E/F Super Hornet – Boeing
 EA-18G Growler – Boeing
 F-19 – skipped
 F-20 Tigershark – Northrop (redesignated from F-5G)
 F-21 Kfir – Israel Aerospace Industries
 F-22 Raptor – Lockheed Martin
 YF-22 – Lockheed Martin
 FB-22 – Lockheed Martin
 F-23 Black Widow II – Northrop/McDonnell Douglas

Non-sequential designations 
 F-35 Lightning II – Lockheed Martin
 F-117 Nighthawk – Lockheed

Other designations 
Designations YF-110, YF-112 through YF-116, and YF-118 were captured foreign aircraft used for evaluation and aggressor training. They were given designations in sequence—based on chronology—with black project aircraft, continuing the pre-1962 "F" series.

 YF-24 – mentioned in a USAF test pilot's official biography, possibly classified
 YF-110 – Mikoyan-Gurevich
 YF-110C – Chengdu
 YF-112 – Sukhoi
 YF-113 – Mikoyan-Gurevich
 YF-113B – Mikoyan-Gurevich
 YF-113G – possible USAF "black project"
 YF-114 – Mikoyan-Gurevich
 YF-117
 YF-117A – Lockheed (later made official)
 YF-117D Tacit Blue – Northrop
 YF-118 – Boeing

G: Glider 
 G-1 – Schweizer
 G-2 – Schweizer
 G-3 – Schweizer
 G-4 – Schweizer
 G-5 – Schweizer
 G-6 – Schweizer
 G-7 – Schweizer
 G-8 – Schweizer
 G-9 – Schleicher
 G-10 – Let
 G-11 – Stemme
 G-12 – Caproni Vizzola
 G-13 – skipped
 G-14 – Aeromot
 G-15 – Schempp-Hirth
 G-15B – Schempp-Hirth
 G-16 – DG Flugzeugbau

H: Helicopter 
Unlike most other categories of aircraft, the introduction of the tri-service designation system in 1962 did not result in a wholesale redesignation of helicopters. While six types received new designations in the unified, "re-started" sequence, the original "H-" series of designations that started in 1948 was also continued, and no further types of rotorcraft have been designated in the "post-1962" system.

 H-1 – Bell
 UH-1 Iroquois – Bell (redesignated from Army HU-1 and Air Force H-40, UH-1F redesignated from H-48)
 UH-1N Twin Huey – Bell
 UH-1Y Venom – Bell
 AH-1 Cobra – Bell
 AH-1J/T/W SeaCobra/SuperCobra – Bell
 AH-1Z Viper – Bell
 H-2 Seasprite – Kaman (redesignated from Navy HU2K)
 H-2G Super Seasprite – Kaman
 H-3 Sea King – Sikorsky (redesignated from Navy HSS-2)
 H-3C/E/F Sea King – Sikorsky
 H-4 – Bell (redesignated from Army HO-4)
 H-5 – Fairchild Hiller (redesignated from Army HO-5)
 H-6 Cayuse – Hughes/ McDonnell Douglas/MD Helicopters (redesignated from Army HO-6)
 AH-6 Little Bird – Boeing
 MH-6 Little Bird – Hughes/ McDonnell Douglas/MD Helicopters

Continuation of 1948 sequence 
Only aircraft designated after the adoption of the Tri-Service system are listed below.  For aircraft in the sequence designated before 1962, see List of United States Air Force aircraft designations (1919–1962).
 H-46 Sea Knight – Boeing Vertol
 H-47 Chinook – Boeing Vertol
 H-48 – Bell (redesignated UH-1F)
 H-49 – Boeing Vertol (redesignated H-46B)
 H-50 DASH – Gyrodyne

 H-51 – Lockheed
 H-52 Sea Guard – Sikorsky
 H-53 Sea Stallion – Sikorsky
 MH-53 Pave Low – Sikorsky
 CH-53E Super Stallion – Sikorsky
 CH-53K King Stallion – Sikorsky
 H-54 Tarhe – Sikorsky
 H-55 Osage – Hughes
 H-56 Cheyenne – Lockheed
 H-57 Sea Ranger – Bell
 H-58 Kiowa – Bell
 H-59 – Sikorsky
 H-60 Black Hawk – Sikorsky
 Sikorsky SH-60 Seahawk – Sikorsky
 Sikorsky HH-60 Pave Hawk – Sikorsky
 Sikorsky MH-60 Jayhawk – Sikorsky
 H-61 – Boeing Vertol
 H-62 – Boeing Vertol
 H-63 Kingcobra – Bell
 H-64 Apache – Hughes
 H-65 Dolphin – Aérospatiale
 H-66 Comanche – Boeing/Sikorsky
 H-67 Creek – Bell
 H-68 Stingray – Agusta
 H-69 – skipped
 H-70 Arapaho – Bell
 H-71 Kestrel – Lockheed Martin
 H-72 Lakota – Eurocopter
 H-73 Koala – AgustaWestland

Non-sequential designations 
 H-90 Enforcer – MD Helicopters
 H-92 – Sikorsky
 VH-92 – Sikorsky
 H-139 Grey Wolf – AgustaWestland

K: Tanker 
No specialised types have been acquired to receive a stand-alone 'K for Tanker' designation; for aircraft modified for use as tankers, see the parent aircraft in the proper sequence.

L: Laser-equipped 
 L-1 – Boeing

O: Observation 
 O-1 Bird Dog – Cessna (redesignated from Air Force L-19)
 O-2 Skymaster – Cessna
 O-3 Quiet Star – Lockheed
 O-4 – reserved for a quiet observation aircraft, speculated to have been the Wren 460QB
 O-5 ARL – de Havilland Canada
 O-6 – de Havilland Canada

P: Maritime patrol 
 P-1 – skipped
 P-2 Neptune – Lockheed (redesignated from Navy P2V)
 P-3 Orion – Lockheed (redesignated from Navy P3V)
 EP-3 Orion/ARIES – Lockheed
 WP-3D Orion – Lockheed
 P-4 Privateer – Consolidated (redesignated from Navy PB4Y-2/P4Y-2)
 P-5 Marlin – Martin (redesignated from Navy P5M)
 P-6 – skipped
 P-7 – Lockheed (not built)
 P-8 Poseidon – Boeing
 P-9 – McDonnell Douglas (not built)

Q: Unmanned Aerial Vehicle (UAV) 
 Q-1 Predator – General Atomics
 Q-1C Gray Eagle – General Atomics
 Q-2 Pioneer – AAI/Israel Aerospace Industries
 Q-3 Dark Star – Lockheed Martin/Boeing
 Q-4 Global Hawk – Northrop Grumman
 Q-4C Triton – Northrop Grumman
 Q-5 Hunter – Israel Aerospace Industries
 Q-6 Outrider – Alliant
 Q-7 Shadow – AAI
 Q-8 Fire Scout – Northrop Grumman
 Q-8C Fire Scout – Northrop Grumman
 Q-9 Reaper – General Atomics
 Q-10 SnowGoose – MMIST
 Q-11 Raven – AeroVironment
 Q-12 – AeroVironment
 Q-13 – skipped
 Q-14 Dragon Eye – AeroVironment
 Q-15 Neptune – DRS
 Q-16 T-Hawk – Honeywell
 Q-17 SpyHawk – MTC Technologies
 Q-18 Hummingbird – Boeing
 Q-19 Aerosonde – AAI
 Q-20 Puma – AeroVironment
Q-20 Avenger – General Atomics (conflicting designation)
 Q-21 Integrator – Boeing Insitu
 Q-22 – AeroVironment
 Q-23 – NASC
 Q-24 – Kaman
 Q-25 Stingray – Boeing
 Q-26 – skipped
 Q-27 – Boeing

Non-sequential designations 
 Q-58 – Kratos
 Q-72 Great Horned Owl – Northrop Grumman
 Q-170 Sentinel – Lockheed Martin
 Q-180 – Northrop Grumman

R: Reconnaissance 
 R-1 – Lockheed (redesignated to U-2S in 1991)

S: Anti-submarine warfare 
 S-1 – skipped
 S-2 Tracker – Grumman (redesignated from Navy S2F)
 S-3 Viking/Shadow – Lockheed

S: Spaceplane 
S is also used as a vehicle type designator spaceplanes.

 S-1 – DARPA (not built)

SR: Strategic Reconnaissance 
The "SR" sequence is a continuation of the original USAF bomber sequence, which ended at B-70.

 SR-71 Blackbird – Lockheed
 SR-72 – Lockheed Martin (in development)

T: Trainer 
Despite the adoption of the unified Mission Designation System in 1962, only two aircraft were designated in the new sequence, both former Navy types.  New trainer aircraft after 1962 continued to use the original sequence.  In 1990, an alternate sequence was started, with the first designation being T-1, though the old sequence continues to be used.  The next designation available in the 'T' series is T-54 or T-8, depending on which series is continued.

Continued original sequence (1962–present) 
Only aircraft designated after the adoption of the Tri-Service system are listed below.  For aircraft in the sequence designated before 1962, see List of United States Air Force aircraft designations (1919–1962).

 T-41 Gulfstream – Grumman (redesignated TC-4B, not built)
 T-41 Mescalero – Cessna (conflicting designation, assigned after the original T-41 was redesignated)
 T-42 Seminole – Beechcraft (redesignated U-8G)
 T-42 Cochise – Beechcraft (conflicting designation, assigned after the original T-42 was redesignated)
 T-43 – Boeing
 T-44 Pegasus – Beechcraft
 T-45 Goshawk – McDonnell Douglas/BAE Systems
 T-46 – Fairchild
 T-47 – Cessna
 T-48 – Cessna (not built)
 T-48 MPATS – unknown contractor (conflicting designation, assigned after the original T-48 was canceled, not built)
 T-49 – Boeing
 T-50 Golden Eagle – Korea Aerospace Industries (designation reserved, none procured)
 T-51 – Cessna
 T-52 – Diamond
 T-53 – Cirrus
 T-54 – Beechcraft (designation reserved, production yet to begin)

1962 redesignations  
 T-1 SeaStar – Lockheed (redesignated from Navy T2V)
 T-2 Buckeye – North American (redesignated from Navy T2J)

1990 Sequence 
 T-1 Jayhawk – Raytheon/Hawker Beechcraft
 T-2 – skipped (T-2 Buckeye was still in service)
 T-3 Firefly – Slingsby
 T-4 – skipped
 T-5 – skipped
 T-6 Texan II – Hawker Beechcraft
 T-7 Red Hawk – Boeing

U: Utility 
 U-1 Otter – de Havilland Canada
 U-2 – Lockheed (cover designation to hide the aircraft's true role)
 U-3 – Cessna (redesignated from Air Force L-27)
 U-4 – Aero Commander (redesignated from Air Force L-26)
 U-5 Twin Courier – Helio
 U-6 Beaver – de Havilland Canada (redesignated from Army L-20)
 U-7 Super Cub – Piper (redesignated from Army L-21)
 U-8 Seminole – Beechcraft (redesignated from Army L-23)
 U-9 – Aero Commander (redesignated from Army L-26)
 U-10 Super Courier – Helio (redesignated from Army L-28)
 U-11 Aztec – Piper (redesignated from Navy UO)
 U-12 – skipped
 U-13 – skipped
 U-14 – skipped
 U-15 – skipped
 U-16 Albatross – Grumman (redesignated from Air Force A-16 and Navy UF)
 U-17 Skywagon – Cessna
 U-18 Navion – North American/Ryan (redesignated from Army L-17)
 U-19 Sentinel – Stinson (redesignated from Army L-5)
 U-20 – Cessna (redesignated from Air Force C-126)
 U-21 Ute – Beechcraft
 U-22 Pave Eagle – Beechcraft
 U-23 Peacemaker – Fairchild Hiller/Pilatus
 U-24 Stallion – Helio
 U-25 Huron – Beechcraft (redesignated C-21)
 U-25 Guardian – Dassault (conflicting designation, assigned after the original C-25 was redesignated)
 U-26 Super Skywagon – Cessna
 U-27 Caravan – Cessna
 U-28 – Pilatus

Non-sequential designations 
 U-38 Twin Condor – Schweizer

V: Vertical take-off/short take-off and landing (VTOL/STOL) 
 V-1 – Grumman (redesignated from Army AO-1)
 V-2 – de Havilland Canada (redesignated from Army AC-1)
 V-3 – Bell (redesignated from Air Force H-33)
 V-4 Hummingbird – Lockheed (redesignated from Army VZ-10)
 V-5 Vertifan – Ryan (redesignated from Army VZ-11)
 V-6 Kestrel – Hawker Siddeley (redesignated from Army VZ-12)
 V-7 Buffalo – de Havilland Canada (redesignated from Army AC-2)
 V-8 – Ryan
 V-8 Harrier – Hawker Siddeley (conflicting designation, assigned after original V-8 was retired)
 V-8B Harrier II – McDonnell Douglas/British Aerospace
 V-9 – Hughes
 V-10 Bronco – Rockwell/Boeing
 V-11 Marvel – Parsons
 V-12 – Pilatus (not built)
 V-12 – Rockwell (conflicting designation, assigned after original V-12 was canceled)
 V-13 – skipped
 V-14 – skipped to avoid confusion with X-14
 V-15 – Bell
 V-16 Harrier – McDonnell Douglas/British Aerospace (unofficial, not built)
 V-17 – assigned to a U.S. Army project but not used
 V-18 Twin Otter – de Havilland Canada
 V-19 – assigned to a U.S. Navy project but canceled
 V-20 Chiricahua – Pilatus
 V-21 – rumored designation of an Airship Industries project
 V-22 Osprey – Bell/Boeing
 V-23 Scout – Dominion
 V-24 LightningStrike – Aurora

X: Special research 

In addition to aircraft intended to support military operations, the unified system includes experimental craft designed to push the boundaries of aeronautical and aerospace knowledge. These aircraft are designated in the "X-series", which led them to become known as "X-planes". Only those designated after 1962 are listed here.  Some aircraft did not have military sponsors, but since they were designated under the same sequence they are listed here.  For aircraft in the sequence designated before 1962, see #X: Experimental (1948–1962).

 X-21 – Northrop
 X-22 – Bell
 X-23 PRIME – Martin Marietta (unofficial)
 X-24 – Martin Marietta
 X-25 – Bensen
 X-26 Frigate – Schweizer
 X-27 – Lockheed (not built)
 X-28 – Osprey
 X-29 – Grumman
 X-30 – Rockwell (not built)
 X-31 – Rockwell/MBB
 X-32 – Boeing
 X-33 – Lockheed Martin (not built)
 X-34 – Orbital
 X-35 – Lockheed Martin
 X-36 – McDonnell Douglas
 X-37 – Boeing
 X-38 – NASA/Scaled Composites
 X-39 – unknown contractor (unofficial)
 X-40 – Boeing
 X-41 – unknown contractor
 X-42 – unknown contractor
 X-43 – NASA
 X-44 MANTA – Lockheed Martin (not built)
 X-44 – Lockheed Martin (conflicting designation)
 X-45 – Boeing
 X-46 – Boeing (not built)
 X-47 Pegasus – Northrop Grumman
 X-47B – Northrop Grumman
 X-47C – Northrop Grumman
 X-48 – Boeing
 X-49 SpeedHawk – Piasecki
 X-50 Dragonfly – Boeing
 X-51 Waverider – Boeing
 X-52 – skipped
 X-53 – Boeing
 X-54 – Gulfstream (in development)
 X-55 – Lockheed Martin
 X-56 – Lockheed Martin
 X-57 Maxwell – NASA (in development)
 X-58 – skipped
 X-59 QueSST – Lockheed Martin (in development)
 X-60 – Generation
 X-61 Gremlins – Dynetics
 X-62 VISTA – General Dynamics (redesignated from NF-16D in 2021)

Z: Lighter-than-air 
 Z-1 – Goodyear
 Z-2 Sentinel – Westinghouse/Airship Industries (not built)
 Z-3 – American Blimp
 Z-4 – Hybrid Air Vehicles

See also

 F/A-XX program
 List of U.S. DoD aircraft designations
 United States military aircraft serial numbers
 List of active United States military aircraft
 List of undesignated military aircraft of the United States
 List of United States Air Force aircraft designations (1919–1962)
 List of United States Navy aircraft designations (pre-1962)
 United States military aircraft engine designations
 List of fighter aircraft
 List of maritime patrol aircraft
 List of airborne early warning aircraft
 List of tanker aircraft
 United States unified missile designation sequence

References

Notes

Citations

External links
 OrBat United States of America – MilAvia Press.com: Military Aviation Publications
 U.S. Military Aircraft and Weapon Designations
 Designation-Systems.Net
 Joe Baugher Homepage
 Main Aircraft Page
 National Museum of the USAF – Home
 Brown-Shoe Navy:  U.S. Naval Aviation
 Uncommon Aircraft

United States Tri-Service, List of aircraft designations
Aircraft, Tri-Service